Thakarius "Bopete" Keyes (born November 9, 1997) is an American football cornerback for the Baltimore Ravens of the National Football League (NFL). He played college football at Tulane.

College career
In 2019, Keyes started every game for Tulane and held opposing quarterbacks to a 45 percent completion percentage rate when he was targeted. He was an Honorable Mention All-American Athletic Conference honoree. In his junior and senior seasons, Keyes had 85 tackles, 18 passes defended and two interceptions.

Professional career

Kansas City Chiefs
Keyes was selected by the Kansas City Chiefs in the seventh round of the 2020 NFL Draft with the 237th overall pick. He was placed on the active/non-football injury list on July 26, 2020. He was activated on August 16, 2020. He finished his rookie season playing in eight games and recording eight total tackles.

On August 31, 2021, Keyes was waived by the Chiefs.

Indianapolis Colts
On September 1, 2021, Keyes was claimed off waivers by the Colts. He was waived on November 13 and re-signed to the practice squad. He was released on November 22.

New England Patriots
On November 30, 2021, Keyes was signed to the New England Patriots practice squad, but was released the next day.

Chicago Bears
On December 15, 2021, Keyes was signed to the Chicago Bears practice squad. He signed a reserve/future contract with the Bears on January 11, 2022. He was waived on August 23, 2022.

Houston Texans
On September 13, 2022, Keyes was signed to the Houston Texans practice squad. He was released on October 18.

Atlanta Falcons
On October 25, 2022, Keyes was signed to the Atlanta Falcons practice squad. He was released on November 8.

Houston Texans (second stint)
On November 17, 2022, Keyes was signed to the Houston Texans practice squad. He was released later that day.

Baltimore Ravens
On December 7, 2022, Keyes was signed to the Baltimore Ravens practice squad. He signed a reserve/future contract on January 16, 2023.

References

External links
Kansas City Chiefs bio
Tulane Green Wave bio
ESPN bio

1997 births
Living people
People from Laurel, Mississippi
Players of American football from Mississippi
American football cornerbacks
Tulane Green Wave football players
Kansas City Chiefs players
Indianapolis Colts players
New England Patriots players
Chicago Bears players
Houston Texans players
Atlanta Falcons players
Baltimore Ravens players